Grady County Courthouse may refer to:

Grady County Courthouse (Georgia), Cairo, Georgia
Grady County Courthouse (Oklahoma), Chickasha, Oklahoma, listed on the National Register of Historic Places